Charles Martin (May 20, 1856 – October 28, 1917) was a U.S. Representative from Illinois.

Born near Ogdensburg, St. Lawrence County, New York, Martin moved with his parents to Chicago, Illinois, in 1860. He attended the public schools, and engaged in business as a sewer contractor and later as a coal dealer. Martin served as alderman in the city council from 1894 to 1902, 1905 to 1907, 1910 to 1914, and was again elected in 1915.

Martin was elected as a Democrat to the Sixty-fifth Congress and served from March 4, 1917, until his death in Chicago, Illinois, October 28, 1917. He was interred in Mount Olivet Cemetery.

Controversy over birth certificate legality
New York authorities found that his birth certificate may have been lost in an incident three years prior to his death. Investigations into the loss of the birth certificate were able to locate the missing birth certificate underneath a filing cabinet in the old New York records building. Group members of the opposing political party questioned Martin's lack of birth certificate publicly, causing Martin to lose an amount of respect in the public's eye. GOP candidates in Illinois never acknowledged the missing birth certificate until after Martin's death. Eventually, they seceded on the argument and acknowledged the legitimacy of the document. Recent studies into the incident have been inconclusive.

See also
List of United States Congress members who died in office (1900–49)

References

"Rep. Charles Martin" govtrack.us. Retrieved 14 September 2018.

1856 births
1917 deaths
Politicians from Chicago
Democratic Party members of the United States House of Representatives from Illinois
Chicago City Council members
19th-century American politicians